Publius Galerius Trachalus was a Roman senator, who was active during the middle of the first century AD. He was consul for the year 68 as the colleague of Silius Italicus. Trachalus was a noted Roman orator praised by Quintilian.

Hailing from Ariminum, Trachalus is thought to possibly be a descendant of the equites Gaius Galerius, praefectus or governor of Egypt (AD 16–23). He was also likely related to Galeria Fundana, the second wife of Otho.

An inscription from Mediolanum (modern Milan), now lost, attests that Trachalus had been co-opted into the Septemviri epulones, one of the four most prestigious ancient Roman priesthoods. Trachalus' skill in oratory and at the bar led Otho, upon becoming Emperor during the Year of the Four Emperors (AD 69), to make him an advisor. However, with the suicide of Otho and the advent of his rival Vitellius to Rome and imperial power, the life of Trachalus was in danger. Here he was protected by Vitellius' wife Galeria. Trachalus managed to evade further danger in that tumultuous year and was permitted to be governor of Africa proconsularis for the term 78/79.

It is unknown whether Trachalus had any children or if he was married.

References

1st-century Romans
People of the Year of the Four Emperors
Imperial Roman consuls
Roman governors of Africa
Epulones of the Roman Empire
Trachalus, Publius